The Doll House was a famous restaurant in Palm Springs which was run by Ethel and George Strebe from 1946.  It was first mentioned in a local newspaper in 1935. It was patronised by celebrities who were entertained by other stars such as Peggy Lee.  It closed in 1966, being replaced by an Italian restaurant, Sorrentino's.

One of the staff employed there was Naomi Parker who is thought to be the woman in the We Can Do It! poster.

References

Restaurants in California